On 15 February 2022, intense rainfall in Petrópolis, Rio de Janeiro, Brazil caused mudslides and flooding that destroyed parts of the city. At least 231 people died in the disaster.

The Background 
Petrópolis is a popular tourist city in Brazil, and as it expanded, its poorer residents built upon the nearby mountainsides. This led to deforestation and poor drainage in these areas of the city. From 2007 to 2010 geologists carried out a number of reports and landslide risk map for the Quitandinha district, and found the most vulnerable areas of the municipality. These findings should have been disseminated throughout Petropolis but, due to insufficient funding, this did not happen.
Additionally, the local authorities of Petrópolis ordered a survey in 2017 and identified 15,240 houses with a high risk of being destroyed due to heavy rainfalls, which covered about 18% of the city. The city, however, was unable to act on this report.

The National Natural Disaster Alert Monitoring Center (Cemaden) issued an alert on the magnitude of the storm two days before the floods on 15 February. According to specialists, the warning should have prompted the authorities to mobilize to evacuate the residents. Despite the intensity of the tragedy that would be drawn a few hours later, this alert was issued in a classification of "moderate risk of landslides".

Event 

On February 15, 2022, the city of Petrópolis received an unusually high amount of rain within three hours, . This was more than the prior 30 days combined, and the worst the city had seen since 1932. According to Cemaden, of the rain recorded during that day,  was recorded between 4:20pm and 7:20pm. It was the biggest storm in the history of Petrópolis, since measurements began in 1932. The previous record had occurred on August 20, 1952, when it rained  in 24 hours.

The high level of precipitation caused flooding within the city as well as destabilized the mountainside, causing mudslides. Videos of the disaster were widely shared on social media, showing cars and houses being dragged by landslides. By February 21, the death toll reached 176, including at least 27 children and teenagers.  As of February 28, the death toll has risen to 231, with 5 people still missing. This event is the deadliest flood and mudslide in Petrópolis' history, exceeding the 1988 event which left 171 dead.

Impacts

The damages from the floods and mudslides exceeded 1 billion Brazilian reals when considering reconstruction costs. The estimated loss is 665 million reals from the municipality's gross domestic product (GDP), equivalent to 2%, in data that considers only the direct impact. On top of that, over 78 million reals worth of goods were damaged.

Reactions 
The city hall of Petrópolis declared three days of mourning.

Cláudio Castro, the governor of the state of Rio de Janeiro compared the situation to that of a war zone: "The situation is almost like war ... Cars hanging from poles, cars overturned, lots of mud and water still."

President Jair Bolsonaro, who was on a diplomatic trip to Russia and Hungary at the time of the flooding, expressed solidarity with the city. It was later confirmed that Bolsonaro would visit Petrópolis on his return to Brazil. The Brazilian federal government also announced that it would give R$2.3 million to the city.

The Ministry of Health stated they would help the situation by providing medical resources. They also informed that 13 Basic Health Units (UBS) and one Emergency Care Unit (UPA) were damaged by the floods.

See also

 Weather of 2022
 2022 Brazil floods and landslides
 January 2011 Rio de Janeiro floods and mudslides
 Late December 2021 Bahia floods
 List of deadliest floods

References

2022 floods in Brazil
Landslides in Brazil
Landslides in 2022
2022 floods
February 2022 events in Brazil
History of Rio de Janeiro (state)